Primštal is a small village in the Municipality of Trebnje in eastern Slovenia. It lies in the traditional region of Lower Carniola, just to the northeast of Trebnje itself. The municipality is included in the Southeast Slovenia Statistical Region.

References

External links
Primštal at Geopedia

Populated places in the Municipality of Trebnje